The Grumman C-1 Trader (TF prior to 1962) is a carrier onboard delivery (COD) variant of the Grumman S-2 Tracker. It was replaced by a similar version of the Northrop Grumman E-2 Hawkeye, the Grumman C-2 Greyhound.

Design and development
The C-1 Trader grew out of a need by the United States Navy for a new anti-submarine airplane. In response to this Grumman began development on a prototype twin-engine, high-wing aircraft which it designated the G-89. In 1952 the Navy designated this aircraft the XS2F-1 and flew it for the first time on December 4 that year. During the rest of the 1950s three major variants emerged, the C-1 Trader being one of them.

Operational history
Throughout the 1960s and 1970s the C-1 Trader carried mail and supplies to aircraft carriers on station in the Pacific Ocean during the Vietnam War and also served as a trainer for all-weather carrier operations. Over its production life 87 C-1 Traders were built, of which four were converted into EC-1A Tracer electronic countermeasures aircraft. The last C-1 was retired from USN service in 1988; it was the second-to-last radial-engine aircraft in U.S military service (The last C-131 wasn't retired until 1990). As of 2010, approximately ten were still airworthy in civil hands, operating as warbirds.

In 1956 the U.S. Marine Corps Test Unit Number 1 (MCTU #1) tested the concept of using the TF-1 variant as a vehicle for inserting reconnaissance teams behind enemy lines.  “On 9 July 1956 MCTU Recon Marines became the first to parachute from a TF-1.  Less than three weeks later, four recon parachutists launched from the USS Bennington, which was 70 miles at sea, and jumped on a desert drop zone near El Centro California, some 100 miles inland.  For the first time in Marine Corps and Naval Aviation history, the technique of introducing recon personnel off a carrier sea base to an inland objective had successfully been tested.”

In August 2010, Brazilian Naval Aviation announced that it would buy and modernize eight C-1 airframes to serve in carrier onboard delivery (COD) and aerial refueling roles for use on its aircraft carrier São Paulo.  In 2011 contract was signed with Marsh Aviation to convert four ex-US Navy C-1A Trader airframes into KC-2 Turbo Traders. The first KC-2 prototype flight was expected for November 2017 and the delivery of the first operational aircraft was scheduled for December 2018.

Variants

TF-1
Carrier Onboard Delivery version of the S-2 Tracker with enlarged fuselage for nine passengers, redesignated C-1A in 1962, 87 built.
TF-1Q
Electronic Countermeasures conversion of the TF-1, redesignated EC-1A in 1962, four conversions.
TF-1W
Airborne Early Warning project that was developed in the WF-2 Tracer.
C-1A
TF-1 redesignated in 1962.
EC-1A
TF-1Q redesignated in 1962.
KC-2 Turbo Trader
Marsh Aviation modernization project for Air-to-Air Refueling, requested for the Brazilian Navy.
G-101
proposed 10-12 seat passenger variant
G-104
proposed tanker variant

Operators

United States Navy
 (Retired)
Brazilian Naval Aviation

Surviving aircraft
Airworthy 
 BuNo 136752 - based at Lauridsen Aviation Museum in Buckeye, Arizona.
 BuNo 136766 - privately owned in Carson City, Nevada.
 BuNo 136773 - privately owned in Wilmington, Delaware.
 BuNo 136778 - based at Champaign Aviation Museum in Urbana, Ohio.
 BuNo 136781 - based at Pacific Coast Air Museum in Santa Rosa, California.
 BuNo 146027 - privately owned in Wilmington, Delaware.
 BuNo 146044 - privately owned in Eskridge, Kansas.
 BuNo 146048 - privately owned in Reno, Nevada.
 BuNo 146052 - based at Lone Star Flight Museum in Galveston, Texas.

On display
 BuNo 136754 - National Museum of Naval Aviation, NAS Pensacola, Pensacola, Florida.
 BuNo 136790 - Grissom Air Museum, Grissom ARB (former Grissom AFB), Kokomo, Indiana.
 BuNo 146034 - Wings of Freedom Aviation Museum, former NAS Willow Grove, Horsham, Pennsylvania.
 BuNo 146036 - USS Midway Museum, San Diego, California.

Specifications (C-1A)

See also

References

External links

C-001 Trader
1950s United States military transport aircraft
High-wing aircraft
Carrier-based aircraft
Aircraft first flown in 1955
Twin piston-engined tractor aircraft